The Noble Judah Estate is a historic estate at 111 and 211 West Westminster Street in Lake Forest, Illinois. The estate was built from 1925 to 1928 for lawyer Noble Brandon Judah, his wife and National Cash Register heiress Dorothy Patterson, and their children. It includes a main house, a garden, a pool, and several small outbuildings. The main house and the outbuildings were given French Renaissance Revival designs by architect Philip Lippincott Goodwin; their designs include steep roofs, decorative brickwork, and half-timbering. The estate's landscape design was inspired by traditional French gardens and includes a small Korean boxwood garden with a geometric layout.

The estate was added to the National Register of Historic Places on August 3, 1990.

References

National Register of Historic Places in Lake County, Illinois
French Renaissance Revival architecture
Renaissance Revival architecture in Illinois
Houses on the National Register of Historic Places in Illinois
Houses completed in 1928
Lake Forest, Illinois